Vibrant Express, also known as MTR CRH380A or MTR380A is a high-speed train operated by Hong Kong government-owned public transport operator MTR. It was manufactured by Chinese state-owned manufacturer CSR Qingdao Sifang (now CRRC Qingdao Sifang) based on the CRH380A Hexie EMUs developed for China Railway. Nine 8-car trainsets were ordered by the Hong Kong government through the MTR Corporation and delivered between 2016-17. It is the first high-speed train produced by CRRC not operated by China Railway.

The train runs between West Kowloon station and Guangzhou South station on the Guangzhou–Shenzhen–Hong Kong Express Rail Link.

Overview 
Vibrant Express is based on the CRH380A electric multiple units (EMUs) high-speed trains designed and manufactured by CSR.

MTR's procurement team, after assessing the tender's qualifications announced in March 2012 that CSR Qingdao Sifang had been awarded with the contract worth HK$1.74 billion.

On , West Kowloon station and the Hong Kong section of the XRL began commercial operations. MTR-0252 brought the first passengers (including reporters) from West Kowloon station to Shenzhen North station.

Technical features
Two different materials were used for the body of the train cars: aluminium alloy and fibre-reinforced plastics (FRP). Aluminium alloy was chosen for use on most of the body due to its low weight and high strength so safe high-speed performance could be achieved. For the nose cone, FRP was used because of its ability to be molded into complex aerodynamic shapes necessary sustained at the front of the train in high-speed operations and continue to maintain its structural strength.
However, the use of these two materials with different coefficients of linear thermal expansion meant the different rates of expansion could lead to paint peeling off the body. This problem was addressed by using two separate gasket rings on the nose cone to separate it into different sections which are painted independently. They can be distinguished from CRH380A trains operated by China Railway which only have 1 gasket ring. 

Further improvement on collision and fire resistance as well as electromagnetic compatibility and other properties.
Improved low-resistance shape.
The optimisation of the bogie design and improvement of the interior structure.
High-strength air tightness: to further enhance the airtight performance, the fully sealed pressurisation of differential pressure control mode is adopted. The rate of pressure change does not exceed .
Improved bogie.
Noise control: Using a variety of new noise absorption materials and noise barrier technology, EMU speed of  inside noise keep in 67–69 dB level.
High-efficiency regenerative braking.
Ergonomic passenger interface.
Label text (including fleet number and seat class name) on car body is painted with MTR typefaces, including MTR Song for Chinese characters and Myriad MM for alphanumeric characters.

Classes
The Vibrant Express uses the same naming convention for travel classes as those used by G-series trains, the fastest train services operated by China Railway. 

The trains have two classes of seats, second/standard class and first class. However, unlike the closely-related CRH380A trainsets operated by China Railway, the Vibrant Express does not offer higher-end premium and business class seating or have buffet cars. This is because the Vibrant Express are short-haul trains that service only between Guangzhou South and West Kowloon.

Free Wi-Fi is provided to all passengers. Every car has baggage racks located above the seats and multi-standard power sockets. All seats are reclining and include a foldable seat table and foot rest. Two wheelchair spaces are located on the seventh of the train.

There are 511 second class seats located in the six intermediate carriages of the train. The second class coaches use 3-2 seat configuration with a mixture of orange, grey and red seats. Coat hooks are available on the sides of every row (next to the windows). 

68 first class seats are in a 2-2 configuration and are located on the two end cars of the train. The class feature floral patterns in silver grey and rose red on the seats as well as the floor and walls. Each seat is provided with a reading light an on-board audio and TV entertainment system with an headphone jack. TVs are located at the center and ends of the coach. Coat hooks are featured on the side of every row (next to the window) and the back of every aisle seat. In general. first class tickets are 50-60% more expensive than second class tickets.

Formation

Formation Nomenclature
The numbering and classification system of Vibrant Express train cars is based on the one used for CRH380A trains operated by China Railway. 

Power Designation

 M: Motor car
 T: Trailer car
 C: Driver cabin
 P: Pantograph car

Coach Types

 ZE: Second/standard class (Pinyin: Èr Děng Zuò Chē)
 ZY: First class (Pinyin: Yī Děng Zuò Chē)

Set numbers 

Set numbers are composed of the rolling stock type followed by the fleet number. They are displayed on the sides of the end cars. All Vibrant Express trains are part of the CRH380A family.

Carriage Number

 First 4 digits: Fleet number (0251-0259)
 0253XX: Fleet no. 0253
 5th and 6th digits: Car number (01-08)
 XXXX05 = Car no. 5

Formation method

Distribution 
As of August 2022

MTR order information

Gallery

See also
 Hexie (train)
 China Railway CRH380A
 High-speed rail in China
 List of high-speed trains

References

External links
 MTR High Speed Rail

MTR rolling stock
Electric multiple units of Hong Kong
CRRC multiple units
Passenger trains running at least at 200 km/h in commercial operations
Passenger trains running at least at 250 km/h in commercial operations
Passenger trains running at least at 300 km/h in commercial operations

ja:中国高速鉄道CRH380A型電車#香港鉄路動感号CRH380A型電車
25 kV AC multiple units
Electric multiple units of China